Chris Evert Lloyd defeated the defending champion Martina Navratilova in the final, 6–0, 6–0 to win the singles tennis title at the 1981 Murjani WTA Championships. Evert lost no sets and just twelve games en route to the title.

Seeds
The first eight seeds received a bye into the second round.

Draw

Finals

Top half

Section 1

Section 2

Bottom half

Section 3

Section 4

References

External links
 Official results archive (ITF)
 Official results archive (WTA)

Murjani WTA Championships - Singles
Singles